Numbered highways in Canada are split by province, and a majority are maintained by their province or territory transportation department. All highways in Canada are numbered except for three in the Northwest Territories, one in Alberta, one in Ontario, and one in Quebec. Ontario's 7000 series are not marked with their highway number but have been assigned one by the Ministry of Transportation. A number of highways in all provinces are better known locally by their name rather than their number. Some highways have additional letters added to their number: A is typically an alternate route, B is typically a business route, and other letters are used for bypass (truck) routes, connector routes, scenic routes, and spur routes. The territory of Nunavut has no highways.

Classifications
This is a breakdown of the classifications of highways in each province, and an example shield of each classification where available.

Trans-Canada

The Trans-Canada Highway crosses all provinces of Canada.
Trans-Canada Highway
Yellowhead Highway

Alberta

All provincial highways in Alberta are 'Primary Highways'. They are divided into two series, and sub-series.
1-216 Series — core highway network
Hwy 1-100 — intercity (Hwy 100 is unmarked, ex:Hwy 2)
Hwy 201, 216 — orbital routes (ex:Hwy 216)
500-986 Series — local highways
Hwy 500-699 — west-east routes (ex:Hwy 501)
Hwy 700-899 — south-north routes (ex:Hwy 881)
900 and X series — potential realignments and extensions (ex:Hwy 986)

British Columbia

Varying between west-east and south-north routes, route numbers in British Columbia span from 1-118, except for Hwy 395 which is a counterpart of US 395. The 400 series highways were renumbered in 1973.
(ex: Hwy 97)

Manitoba

Provincial Trunk Highways (PTH) in Manitoba are divided into two series.
PTH 1-199 — primary routes
PTH 1-89 — intercity (ex:PTH 75)
PTH 100, 101, 110 — loop routes (ex:Perimeter Highway)
PR 200-699 — secondary routes

New Brunswick

Provincial highways in New Brunswick are divided into three series.
Route 1-99 — arterial highways (ex:Route 11)
Route 100-199 — collector highways (ex:Route 108)
Route 200-999 — local highways (ex:Route 275)

Newfoundland and Labrador

Provincial highways in Newfoundland and Labrador are divided into three series.
Main highways
Routes 1, 210, 230, 320, 330, 340, 360, 410, 430, 480, 500, and 510 
Regional roads are numbered by region
Route 2-203 — Avalon Peninsula
Route 204-205, 230-239 — Bonavista Peninsula
Route 210-222 — Burin Peninsula
Route 301-346 — Kittiwake Coast, Fogo Island, & Twillingate
Route 350-371 — Exploits River Valley & Bay d'Espoir
Route 380-392, 410-419 — Baie Verte
Route 401, 420-438 — Great Northern Peninsula
Route 402-407, 440-490 — Western Newfoundland
Route 500-520 — Labrador
 Local highways are based on intersecting primary routes and numbered with extension (i.e. 210-1)

Nova Scotia

Provincial highways in Nova Scotia are divided into five series.
100 Series — arterial highways (ex:Hwy 102)
Trunk Highways (ex:Trunk 4)
Route 200-399 — collector highways (ex:Route 221)
Scenic Routes are unnumbered
Local roads are unnumbered

Ontario

Provincial highways (the King's Highway) in Ontario are divided into four classes:
Hwy 2-148, 400-427, QEW — primary highways
Hwy 2-148 — intercity (ex:Highway 11) usually with at-grade intersections
400-427 — 400-series freeways and limited-access highways
The Queen Elizabeth Way (QEW) is a de facto part of the 400-series, and is given a numerical designation of 451 in some documents, although this number is not posted on the road itself
Hwy 500-699 — secondary highways (ex:Highway 502)
Hwy 800-813 — tertiary highways (ex:Highway 808)
7000-series — resource & industrial roads (unmarked) or short stubs connecting numbered highways

Prince Edward Island

Provincial highways in Prince Edward Island are divided into three series.
Route 1-4 — arterial highways
Route 4-26 — collector highways
Local highways are numbered by county
Route 101-199 — Prince County
Route 201-299 — Queens County
Route 301-399 — Kings County

Quebec

Provincial highways in Quebec are divided into three classes. Odd numbers refer to routes that are generally perpendicular to the Saint Lawrence River. Even numbers refer to routes that are generally parallel to the Saint Lawrence River.
Autoroutes — expressways (Route 920 is unmarked, ex:Autoroute 20)
 Route numbers for bypasses and spurs take on a prefix (4nn-9nn)
100-series — primary highways (ex:Route 138)
Secondary routes
200-series — south of the Saint Lawrence River (ex:Route 263)
300-series — north of the Saint Lawrence River (ex:Route 348)

Saskatchewan

Provincial highways in Saskatchewan are divided into three series, and sub-series.
Hwy 1-99 — primary highways (ex:Hwy 11)
Hwy 100-399 — secondary highways which are spurs of primary highways
Hwy 102-167 — northern routes (ex:Hwy 106)
Hwy 201-271 — routes to recreational areas (ex:Hwy 211)
Hwy 301-397 — routes to minor communities (ex:Hwy 375)
Hwy 600-799, 900-999 — minor highways
Hwy 600-699 — south-north highways
Hwy 700-799 — west-east highways
Hwy 900-999 — northern or isolated roads (ex:Hwy 999)

Northwest Territories

There are currently eight territorial highways in the Northwest Territories. All eight are named and numbered 1-8. There is also the Tuktoyaktuk Winter Road which extends the Dempster Highway (Highway 8), the Mackenzie Valley winter road system that extends Northwest Territories Highway 1, the Tlicho winter road system extending from the Yellowknife Highway and the Ingraham Trail, and the Dettah Ice Road extending from Yellowknife to the community of Dettah.

Nunavut

There are a number of roads and highways in Nunavut; none are yet numbered.

Yukon

There are currently fourteen territorial highways in Yukon. All fourteen are named and numbered 1-11, 14-15, & 37.

See also
 Roads in Canada

 
 
Highways in Canada
Highways and autoroutes in Canada